Matthias Schießleder (born 23 September 1936) is a German judoka. He competed in the men's lightweight event at the 1964 Summer Olympics.

References

External links
 

1936 births
Living people
German male judoka
Olympic judoka of the United Team of Germany
Judoka at the 1964 Summer Olympics
Sportspeople from Essen